Johnson Point may refer to:

Johnson Point (South Georgia)
Johnson Point (Thurston County, Washington)